This article displays the rosters for the teams competing at the 2021 FIBA Women's AmeriCup. Each team had to submit 12 players.

Group A

Brazil
The squad was announced on 10 June 2021.

Canada
The squad was announced on 10 June 2021.

Colombia
The squad was announced on 10 June 2021.

El Salvador

Virgin Islands

Group B

Argentina
The squad was announced on 8 June 2021.

Dominican Republic
The squad was announced on 8 June 2021.

Puerto Rico
The squad was announced on 10 June 2021.

United States
The squad was announced on 6 June 2021.

Venezuela

References

External links
Official website

Squads
FIBA Women's AmeriCup squads